Tallulah Sylva Maria Ormsby-Gore, known professionally as Tallulah Harlech, (born 16 May 1988) is an English fashion stylist, actress, and consultant notable for her styling work in both Pop Magazine and Arena Homme +. She is the daughter of Amanda Harlech and the late Francis Ormsby-Gore, 6th Baron Harlech. She was born in Shropshire.

Early life
Harlech is the second child of Francis Ormsby-Gore, 6th Baron Harlech and Amanda Grieve. Her maternal grandfather is Alan Grieve. As a child, Harlech and her brother spent their summer breaks at Karl Lagerfeld's house in Biarritz. After finishing Cheltenham Ladies' College at age 18, she applied to Lee Strasberg Theatre and Film Institute in New York where she remained for two and a half years.

Career

Modeling
In 2007, Harlech went to New York City where she began assisting in fashion which was followed by her working for John Galliano and Karl Lagerfeld at Chanel. When asked by Alison Taylor of The Daily Telegraph regarding working there she was quoted saying:'It's been an honour. And I hope I can use the fact that I've been fortunate to develop my own ideas.'

In 2016 she appeared on the Jonathan Baron's Baron magazine and in 2017 was one of the models invited to Alexa Chung's fashion shows at the Danish Church of Saint Katherine in North West London.

Acting
As an actress, Harlech was known for appearing in such films such as Spite and Malice and well as a part in a Broadway play Richard III in which she played a wife of Richard III, the latter played by Anatol Yusef.

In 2013, she appeared in a short film called Once Upon a Time... along with Keira Knightley, Stella Tennant, Saskia de Brauw and Lindsey Wixson where she player a role of Ève Lavallière.

References

External links
Tallulah Harlech on Shopping with Karl

English female models
Living people
1988 births
English actresses
Models from London
Daughters of barons
Businesspeople from Shropshire